The 2015 NCAA Division I FBS football season was the highest level of college football competition in the United States organized by the National Collegiate Athletic Association (NCAA). The regular season began on September 3, 2015 and ended on December 12, 2015. The postseason concluded on January 11, 2016 with Alabama defeating Clemson in the 2016 College Football Playoff National Championship. This was the second season of the College Football Playoff (CFP) championship system.

Rule changes
The following rule changes have been made by the NCAA Football Rules Committee for the 2015 season:
 Eight-man officiating crews are made standard in FBS with the addition of the center judge position. Various FBS conferences experimented with eight-man crews in the 2013 and 2014 seasons.
 Unsportsmanlike conduct penalties of 15 yards will be called on players who pull or yank opponents off piles.
 A 10-second runoff and reset of the play clock to 40 seconds will occur if a defensive player's helmet comes off within the final minute of either half. Previously, the play clock was set to 25 seconds and no runoff occurred.
 The five-yard penalty for a first offense sideline warning has been removed, modifying a 2008 rule change. Moving forward, the second offense will be penalized five yards, followed by 15 yards (unsportsmanlike conduct) starting with the third offense.
 Officials will require players with illegal equipment (e.g., "crop-top" jerseys and writing messages on eye black) to leave the field for one play to correct it. Teams may use a time-out to correct the equipment and avoid the player having to sit out the play.
 Instant replay can be used to review if the kicking team blocked the receiving team before an onside kick has gone 10 yards.
 Teams must have 22 minutes for pre-game warmups, which can be shortened by mutual agreement of both teams.
 The play clock will be reset to 40 seconds if the play clock reaches 25 seconds before the ball is ready for play. Previously, the play clock was reset if the play clock ran to 20 seconds.
 Non-standard/overbuilt facemasks are prohibited.

A proposed rule to change the ineligible downfield rule from three yards to one yard past the line of scrimmage was tabled and not voted on; however it will be a point of emphasis for the season.

The use of advanced technology in games (e.g., wireless communication between on-field players and the bench, use of tablets by coaches for non-medical reasons, helmet cameras for players) is being studied by a committee for possible future implementation.

Conference realignment

Membership changes

Charlotte transitioned from the Football Championship Subdivision (FCS) and played its first season in FBS as a provisional member, becoming a football-sponsoring member of Conference USA after joining as a non-football member in 2013.

UAB controversially shut down its football program following the 2014 season, after school administrators claimed that rising monetary costs made fielding an FBS team unfeasible. Following public outcry and fundraising efforts, the school announced less than six months later that the football team would be reinstated. UAB football returned to FBS and Conference USA for the 2017 season.

Other headlines

 June 1 – UAB, which had dropped football after the 2014 season, announced that it would reinstate it as early as 2016.
 July 21 – UAB announced that it had pushed back the return of football to the 2017 season.
 September 1 – The Sun Belt Conference announced that Coastal Carolina would become a full member of the conference on July 1, 2016. The Coastal Carolina football team, a member of the FCS Big South Conference along with the rest of the athletic program at the time of the announcement, began a transition to FBS after the 2015 season, joined Sun Belt football in 2017, and became fully bowl-eligible in 2018.
 January 13, 2016 – The NCAA Division I council approved a rule that, from the 2016 season forward, allows FBS conferences to stage championship games regardless of their current membership numbers. The new rule, as originally proposed by the Big 12 Conference and amended by the Big Ten Conference, stipulates that a conference with fewer than 12 members can stage a championship game under either of the following circumstances:
 The game involves two division winners, with each division having played a round-robin schedule.
 The game involves the top two teams in the conference standings after a full round-robin conference schedule.

Regular season top 10 matchups
Rankings reflect the AP Poll. Rankings for Week 10 and beyond will list College Football Playoff Rankings first and AP Poll second. Teams that fail to be a top 10 team for one poll or the other will be noted.

Week 2
No. 5 Michigan State defeated No. 7 Oregon 31–28 (Spartan Stadium, East Lansing, Michigan)
Week 7
No. 10 Alabama defeated No. 9 Texas A&M 41–23 (Kyle Field, College Station, Texas)
No. 6 LSU defeated No. 8 Florida 35–28 (Tiger Stadium, Baton Rouge, Louisiana)
Week 10
No. 4/7 Alabama defeated No. 2/4 LSU 30–16 (Bryant-Denny Stadium, Tuscaloosa, Alabama)
Week 12
No. 10/10 Baylor defeated No. 6/4 Oklahoma State 45–35 (Boone Pickens Stadium, Stillwater, Oklahoma)
No. 9/9 Michigan State defeated No. 3/2 Ohio State 17–14 (Ohio Stadium, Columbus, Ohio)
Week 13
No. 3/5 Oklahoma defeated No. 11/9 Oklahoma State 58–23 (Boone Pickens Stadium, Stillwater, Oklahoma)
No. 8/8 Ohio State defeated No. 10/12 Michigan 42–13 (Michigan Stadium, Ann Arbor, Michigan)
No. 9/13 Stanford defeated No. 6/4 Notre Dame 38–36 (Stanford Stadium, Stanford, California)
Week 14
No. 5/5 Michigan State defeated No. 4/4 Iowa 16–13 (Big 10 Championship Game, Indianapolis, Indiana)
No. 1/1 Clemson defeated No. 10/8 North Carolina 45–37 (ACC Championship Game, Charlotte, North Carolina)

Upsets

Jacksonville State at Auburn game
On September 12, Auburn avoided a defeat that would have ranked with the biggest upsets in college football history with an overtime touchdown run to a 27–20 win over FCS foe Jacksonville State. Auburn had to score a touchdown in the final minute of regulation just to tie the game and then had to convert another touchdown in Auburn's first possession in overtime to win. 
No FCS team has defeated a ranked FBS team since August 31, 2013, when Eastern Washington beat Oregon State 49–46. An Auburn loss would have compared with Michigan's loss to Appalachian State on September 3, 2007. Jacksonville State, 41-point underdogs entering Saturday's game, nearly became just the second FCS team to defeat an AP Top 10 FBS opponent.

Red River Rivalry
On October 10, then 1-4 Texas stunned #10 4-0 Oklahoma with a thrilling win in the Red River Rivalry. The Longhorns were 17 point underdogs. Texas would go on to win the game 24-17. The Sooners spurred a late comeback, but failed to stop Texas from running out the clock on the final drive of the game.

Upsets involving officiating

Miami vs. Duke
On October 31, Miami beat Duke 30–27 on a game-winning kickoff return for a touchdown that included eight laterals. However, the Atlantic Coast Conference acknowledged the next day that the kickoff return touchdown should not have counted as officials made four major errors during the play:

 A Miami player's knee was down before releasing one of the eight laterals. 
 An illegal block should have been called during the return at Miami's 16-yard line, which would have given the Hurricanes an untimed down at their own 8-yard line.
 Miami should have been penalized for a bench player entering the field of play during the return, although this would not have changed the touchdown ruling.
 A penalty for an illegal block in the back that was rescinded — initially negating Miami's touchdown before officials conferred — was called correctly, but that the referee didn’t properly communicate why the decision was made.

Nebraska vs. Michigan State
On November 7, Nebraska defeated Michigan State by a score of 39–38. Nebraska ran a 91-yard scoring drive in 38 seconds, capped by Tommy Armstrong Jr.'s 30-yard touchdown pass to Brandon Reilly, leaving 17 seconds left in the fourth quarter. Before the catch, Reilly went out of bounds on his route, making him an ineligible receiver. Replay officials determined that Michigan State cornerback Jermaine Edmondson had forced him out of bounds, although replay footage seemed to show that Reilly had gone out of bounds on his own accord. The ruling on the field stood, upholding Nebraska's game-winning touchdown. After the game Bill Carollo, the Big Ten's coordinator of officials, said in a statement via ESPN: "They can't review whether it was a force out/contact on the play. They can only review if there was clear evidence of no contact and he (Reilly) re-established himself in the field of play. If he goes out of bounds on his own with no contact, it's an illegal touch. Therefore, the call stood."

Updated stadiums
No FBS programs opened new stadiums for the 2015 season. However, one school played its first season in FBS, and several other programs expanded or renovated their stadiums:  
Charlotte, playing its first season in FBS, debuted at the on-campus Jerry Richardson Stadium. The stadium opened for the 49ers' first season in 2013 with a capacity of 15,314, but was designed for quick expansion to as much as 40,000.
Kentucky debuted a major renovation to Commonwealth Stadium. A$110 million project reduced the capacity from 67,530 to 61,000, and added a new recruiting plaza in the east end zone surrounded by a new student section, more than 20 new luxury boxes and 2,000 new club seats, new home-team facilities, a revamped exterior, and improved concourses.
UCF took out about 2,000 seats from the east side of Bright House Networks Stadium, replacing them with a new club seating section with a capacity of about 1,000 that includes a beach area.
Auburn debuted the largest video board in college football in Jordan–Hare Stadium. The video board measures 190 feet by 57. The project was expected to cost $13.9 million.
Duke featured a newly renovated Wallace Wade Stadium. The renovations included removal of the track and lowering of the field by several feet; more seating capacity near field level along both sidelines and the north end zone; the replacement of bleachers on the west side of the stadium with Duke blue seats; new brick facades around much of the field; a brand-new, much larger video board and new speakers; a refresh of the concourse area around the top of the bowl, with new sidewalks and brick separating the concourse from the seating area; and new concession booths, restrooms, and concourse lighting along with a new elevator tower. Construction on a new press box, luxury boxes, and attached seats was ongoing throughout the season, and was expected to be complete in time for the 2016 season. These marked the first major upgrades to Wallace Wade Stadium in over 70 years.
Kansas State debuted the Vanier Football Complex in the north end zone of Bill Snyder Family Stadium. This feature includes new seating, a video board, offices, locker rooms and strength training facilities. kstatesports.com
Cincinnati debuted renovations to Nippert Stadium that increased the capacity to 40,000 and added premium seating, a new press box, a new pavilion, additional restrooms, upgraded concessions and improved concourses.
Ole Miss announced plans to renovate Vaught–Hemingway Stadium during the 2015 season and the 2015–16 offseason. The project was intended to bring the stadium's ultimate capacity to 64,038. The stadium was to be turned into a complete bowl, adding club level seating, restrooms, concessions, etc. The renovation was planned for completion by the start of the 2016–17 season. This renovation was part of the Forward Together campaign, which also gave the Rebels a new basketball arena, The Pavilion at Ole Miss, right next to the football stadium.
Texas A&M completed renovations to the west side and facade of Kyle Field, reducing the capacity from the previous season. The project cost over $450 million.

Conference standings

Conference summaries
Rankings reflect the Week 14 AP Poll before the conference championship games were played.

Power 5 Conferences

Group of Five Conferences

CFP College Football Playoff participant

Postseason

Bowl selections

Since the 2014–15 postseason, six College Football Playoff (CFP) bowl games have hosted two semi-final playoff games on a rotating basis. For this season, the Orange Bowl and the Cotton Bowl Classic will host the semi-final games, with the winners advancing to the 2016 College Football Playoff National Championship at University of Phoenix Stadium in Glendale, Arizona.

Bowl eligible teams
American Athletic Conference (8):  Memphis, Houston, Temple, Navy, South Florida, Cincinnati, Connecticut, Tulsa
Atlantic Coast Conference (9):  Clemson, Florida State, Duke, Pittsburgh, North Carolina, Miami (FL), North Carolina State, Louisville, Virginia Tech
Big 12 Conference (7):  Baylor, TCU, Oklahoma State, Oklahoma, Texas Tech, West Virginia, Kansas State
Big Ten Conference (8): Ohio State, Michigan State, Iowa, Indiana, Michigan, Penn State, Northwestern, Wisconsin
Conference USA (5): Western Kentucky, Marshall, Louisiana Tech, Southern Mississippi, Middle Tennessee State
Independents (2): Notre Dame, BYU
Mid-American Conference (7): Toledo, Bowling Green, Northern Illinois, Western Michigan, Ohio, Central Michigan, Akron
Mountain West Conference (7): Boise State, San Diego State, Air Force, Nevada, New Mexico, Utah State, Colorado State
Pac-12 Conference (10): Stanford, Utah, UCLA, Washington State, USC, Oregon, Arizona, California, Arizona State, Washington
Southeastern Conference (10): LSU, Alabama, Florida, Ole Miss, Mississippi State, Texas A&M, Georgia, Tennessee, Arkansas, Auburn
Sun Belt Conference (4): Georgia Southern, Georgia State, Appalachian State, Arkansas State

Total: 77

Bowl ineligible teams
American Athletic Conference (4): Central Florida, East Carolina, SMU, Tulane
Atlantic Coast Conference (5): Boston College, Georgia Tech, Syracuse, Wake Forest, Virginia
Big 12 Conference (3): Iowa State, Kansas, Texas
Big Ten Conference (6): Illinois, Maryland, Minnesota*, Nebraska*, Purdue, Rutgers
Conference USA (8): Charlotte, North Texas, UTSA, Florida Atlantic, Florida International, UTEP, Rice, Old Dominion
Independents (1): Army
Mid-American Conference (6): Buffalo, Miami (OH), Eastern Michigan, Massachusetts, Ball State, Kent State
Mountain West Conference (5): Wyoming, Hawaii, Fresno State, UNLV, San José State*
Pac-12 Conference (2): Oregon State, Colorado
Southeastern Conference (4): South Carolina, Vanderbilt, Missouri, Kentucky
Sun Belt Conference (7): Louisiana-Lafayette, New Mexico State, Louisiana-Monroe, Idaho, South Alabama, Troy, Texas State

Note: Teams with Asterisk(*) qualified for bowls based on Academic Progress Rate, despite not having a bowl eligible record 

Total: 51

College Football Playoff

Conference performance in bowl games

Rankings

Final CFP rankings

Final rankings

Awards and honors

Heisman Trophy
The Heisman Trophy is given to the year's most outstanding player.

Other overall
Archie Griffin Award (MVP): Deshaun Watson, Clemson
AP Player of the Year: Christian McCaffrey, Stanford
Chic Harley Award (Player of the Year): Christian McCaffrey, Stanford
Maxwell Award (top player): Derrick Henry, Alabama 
SN Player of the Year: Baker Mayfield, Oklahoma
Walter Camp Award (top player): Derrick Henry, Alabama

Special overall
Burlsworth Trophy (top player who began as walk-on): Baker Mayfield, Oklahoma
Paul Hornung Award (most versatile player): Christian McCaffrey, Stanford
Campbell Trophy ("academic Heisman"): Ty Darlington, Oklahoma
Wuerffel Trophy (humanitarian-athlete): Ty Darlington, Oklahoma

Offense
Quarterback

Davey O'Brien Award (quarterback): Deshaun Watson, Clemson 
Johnny Unitas Award (senior/4th year quarterback): Connor Cook, Michigan State
Kellen Moore Award (quarterback): Baker Mayfield, Oklahoma
Manning Award (quarterback): Deshaun Watson, Clemson 
Sammy Baugh Trophy (passing quarterback): Matt Johnson, Bowling Green

Running back

Doak Walker Award (running back): Derrick Henry, Alabama 
Jim Brown Trophy (running back): Dalvin Cook, Florida State

Wide receiver

Fred Biletnikoff Award (wide receiver): Corey Coleman, Baylor
Paul Warfield Trophy (wide receiver): Roger Lewis, Bowling Green

Tight end

John Mackey Award (tight end): Hunter Henry, Arkansas
Ozzie Newsome Award (tight end): Jake Butt, Michigan

Lineman

Dave Rimington Trophy (center): Ryan Kelly, Alabama 
Jim Parker Trophy (offensive lineman): Landon Turner, North Carolina
 Joe Moore Award (offensive line): Alabama

Defense
Bronko Nagurski Trophy (defensive player):  Tyler Matakevich, Temple
Chuck Bednarik Award (defensive player): Tyler Matakevich, Temple
Lott Trophy (defensive impact): Carl Nassib, Penn State

Defensive line

Bill Willis Award (defensive lineman): Myles Garrett, Texas A&M
Dick Butkus Award (linebacker): Jaylon Smith, Notre Dame
Jack Lambert Trophy (linebacker): Joe Schobert, Wisconsin 
Lombardi Award (defensive lineman/linebacker): Carl Nassib, Penn State
Ted Hendricks Award (defensive end): Carl Nassib, Penn State

Defensive back

Jim Thorpe Award (defensive back): Desmond King, Iowa
Jack Tatum Trophy (defensive back): Desmond King, Iowa

Special teams
Lou Groza Award (placekicker): Ka'imi Fairbairn, UCLA
Vlade Award (placekicker): Aidan Schneider, Oregon
Ray Guy Award (punter): Tom Hackett, Utah
Jet Award (return specialist): Christian McCaffrey, Stanford
Peter Mortell Award (holder): Peter Mortell, Minnesota

Other positional awards
Outland Trophy (interior lineman on either offense or defense): Joshua Garnett, Stanford

Coaches
AFCA Coach of the Year: Dabo Swinney, Clemson 
AP Coach of the Year: Dabo Swinney, Clemson
Bobby Dodd Coach of the Year Award: Kirk Ferentz, Iowa 
Eddie Robinson Coach of the Year: Kirk Ferentz, Iowa
Paul "Bear" Bryant Award: Dabo Swinney, Clemson 
SN Coach of the Year: Dabo Swinney, Clemson
The Home Depot Coach of the Year Award: Dabo Swinney, Clemson
Woody Hayes Trophy: Kirk Ferentz, Iowa
Walter Camp Coach of the Year: Dabo Swinney, Clemson

Assistants
AFCA Assistant Coach of the Year: Don Brown, Boston College
Broyles Award: Lincoln Riley, Oklahoma

All-Americans

Coaching changes
This is restricted to coaching changes taking place on or after May 1, 2015. For coaching changes that occurred earlier in 2015, see 2014 NCAA Division I FBS end-of-season coaching changes.

Television viewers and ratings

Most watched regular season games

Conference championship games

College Football Playoff

^ESPN Megacast

See also

 2015 NCAA Division I FCS football season

References

External links